The Ambrolauri Municipality (Ambrolauris Munits'ipaliteti) is a self-governing subdivision in western Georgia. Its governing bodies are based in the city of Ambrolauri. Together with the neighboring municipalities Lentekhi, Oni, and Tsageri, the Ambrolauri Municipality forms the region of Racha-Lechkhumi and Kvemo Svaneti. The municipality has an area of is 1142 km2, and population of 10,405 (2021).

Geography
Ambrolauri is situated in the Greater Caucasus's southern slope zone and borders various subranges of the Caucasus. Its southern geographical boundary is the Racha Range while in the north it is limited by the Lechkhumi Range, where its highest mountains peaks are located. The municipality is crossed by the Rioni and its tributaries Krikhula, Znakura, Shareula, Lukhuni, Ritseula and Askistskali. Due to the mountainous character the agricultural land only occupies 240 km2 (21%) of the sparsely populated municipal territory. The municipality contains rich resources of arsenic and gypsum.

History

The municipality was created as a raion in 1930. Until then, its territory was part of Racha Uyezd in Kutaisi Governorate and between 1928 and 1930 of the short-lived Racha-Lechkhumi Uyezd when it became an independent district (raion). In 1951–1953, it was a part of the Kutaisi Okrug. With the creation of administrative regions in 1995, Ambrolauri became part of Racha-Lechkhumi and Kvemo. In 2006 the raion was transformed into a municipality.

Between 2014 and 2017 the city of Ambrolauri, like six others, was separated from the municipality and was a so-called "self-governed" city (or kalaki). In 2017 this decision was reverted and the city Ambrolauri, like six other cities, lost its self-governing status again when the central government deemed this reform too expensive and inefficient.

Administrative divisions

The Ambrolauri Municipality is administratively divided into 18 communities (თემი, temi) with 69 villages (სოფელი, sopeli). There is one urban-type settlement (დაბა, daba) and one city (ქალაქი, kalaki).

 city: Ambrolauri;
 daba: Kharistvala;
 villages: 69, such as Abanoeti, Abari, Baji, Tkhmori and Uravi.

Population
The population of Ambrolauri Municipality was 10,405 at the start of 2021, which is a 7% decrease from the last census of 2014.

According to the 2014 census, the ethnic composition is mono-ethnic Georgian (Rachvelian sub-group), apart from a few dozen residents of mixed origin. The population consists of followers of the Georgian Orthodox Church.

Politics

Ambrolauri Municipal Assembly (Georgian: ამბროლაურის საკრებულო, Ambrolauri Sakrebulo) is a representative body in Ambrolauri Municipality, consisting of 30 members which are elected every four years. The last election was held in October 2021. Zviadi Mkheidze of Georgian Dream was elected mayor for a second term.

Economy
Agriculture, especially viticulture-viniculture and animal husbandry, is the main activity of the population. The culture of fruit is developing in the mountainous zones. The main industries are wine factories and cheese factories. The Khvanchkara wine is a key product from Ambrolauri, given the name of the village near Ambrolauri city. It is the only area in Georgia where this wine is allowed to be made.

Transport 

The municipality of Ambrolauri is well connected to the rest of Racha-Lechkhumi and Kvemo Svaneti as well as to the rest of Georgia. Through the municipality passes the national route Sh16 (Kutaisi - Ambrolauri Oni - Mamison Pass) which follows the Rioni River upstream from Kutaisi and ends via Ambrolauri and Oni at the Mamison Pass on the Russian border. It is also known as the Ossetian Military Road, which was originally constructed in the 19th century as an alternative route from Russia to Georgia, in addition to the existing Georgian Military Road. Today the road ends at the de facto border with South Ossetia, shortly before the Mamison Pass and the Russian border.

The national route Sh17 connects the municipality with central Georgia via Tkibuli and the Ambrolauri Airport offers flights to Natakhtari Airfield, servicing the Tbilisi area. Since 1887, the nearest train station is in Tkibuli, the terminus of the railway line from Kutaisi.

Monuments
 Historical monuments include Nikortsminda Cathedral, Barakoni, Minda Tsikhe, and Khotevis Tsikhe.
 There is also the Shaori Reservoir.

See also 
 List of municipalities in Georgia (country)

References 

Municipalities of Racha-Lechkhumi and Kvemo Svaneti